Surinabant (SR147778) is a cannabinoid receptor type 1 antagonist developed by Sanofi-Aventis. It is being investigated as a potential treatment for nicotine addiction, to assist smoking cessation. It may also be developed as an anorectic drug to assist with weight loss, however there are already several CB1 antagonists or inverse agonists on the market or under development for this application, so surinabant is at present mainly being developed as an anti-smoking drug, with possible application in the treatment of other addictive disorders such as alcoholism. Other potential applications such as treatment of ADHD have also been proposed.

A dose ranging study was done for smoking cessation in 2012; it did not improve success rate, but reduced weight gain.  Inhibition of THC  effects on heart rate was seen at 20 mg and 60 mg but not 5 mg.

See also 
 Cannabinoid receptor antagonist
 O-1269

References 

Cannabinoids
CB1 receptor antagonists
Organobromides
Chloroarenes
Pyrazoles
Hydrazides
1-Piperidinyl compounds
Pyrazolecarboxamides